Cosmah (April 4, 1953 – 1979) was an American Thoroughbred racehorse. While not known for her racing career, she is well known for being the dam of Tosmah and  Halo, who were both top level race winners.

Racing career
Cosmah won the 1955 Astarita Stakes due to the disqualification of another horse named Dark Vintage.

Broodmare
Cosmah's descendants include:
 Tosmah (1961), filly: Frizette Stakes, Astarita Stakes, Mermaid Stakes, Arlington Classic, Beldame Stakes
 Maribeau (1962), colt: Fountain of Youth Stakes
Halo (1969) colt: Lawrence Realization Stakes, Tidal Handicap,  United Nations Handicap
Queen Sucree (1966), filly: Dam of 16 foals out of which were 10 winners. Many of her offspring were successful broodmares and sires. One of Queen Sucrees daughters was Princess Sucree, dam of Group 2 winner Rasheek and third dam of Group 2 winner Hyper.

Cosmah's other descendants include:

Through Tosmah: 1973  New Jersey Futurity winner La Guidecca.

Through Halo: Sunny's Halo, Sunday Silence, Devil's Bag, Glorious Song, Saint Ballado and Goodbye Halo

Through Queen Sucree: 1974 Kentucky Derby winner, Cannonade.

Pedigree

References

1953 racehorse births
1979 racehorse deaths
Racehorses bred in Kentucky
Racehorses trained in the United States
Thoroughbred family 2-d